Northumberland East was an electoral riding in Ontario, Canada. It was created in 1867 at the time of confederation and was abolished in 1925 before the 1926 election. It was merged with Northumberland West to form Northumberland.

Members of Provincial Parliament

References

Former provincial electoral districts of Ontario